Club Sport Herediano, commonly known as Herediano and nicknamed El Team, is a Costa Rican multisport club based in Heredia, Heredia province. Although they compete in a number of different sports, Herediano is mostly known for its association football team. It plays in the Primera División de Costa Rica, the top tier of the Costa Rican football league system. Herediano are one of two clubs to have never been relegated.

Herediano has its origins in 1918. The framework for Asociación Deportiva Club Sport Herediano was simmering since June 1920, with the appointment of an interim board with iconic figures like Manuel Joaquín Gutiérrez, Eladio Rosabal, Víctor Manuel Ruiz, Claudio Arguedas and Luis Valerio, but it was not until June 12, 1921 that the Herediano Charter was signed. In that same year, Eladio Rosabal Cordero became the first manager of the Costa Rica national football team, and Herediano player Manuel Joaquín Gutiérrez became the first scorer of the national team.

The club's first season resulted in Herediano winning the national championship in 1921, the first edition of Costa Rica's top-flight league. Herediano established itself as a major force in Costa Rican football by winning 28 First Division titles through 2019.

El Team plays its home matches at the Estadio Eladio Rosabal Cordero. Herediano's home kit is composed of red and yellow vertical striped shirts, with red shorts, accompanied by yellow and red socks. This combination has been used since 1929. Umbro are the kit manufacturers. Herediano holds many long-standing rivalries, most notably against Alajuelense, Saprissa and Cartaginés. It has contributed many key and famous players towards Costa Rica's FIFA World Cup squads such as Marvin Obando, Germán Chavarría, Claudio Jara, Mauricio Wright, Paulo Wanchope, David Myrie, Óscar Granados, José Miguel Cubero, and Daniel Cambronero.

History
In 1918, Heredians sought to form a football club that would represent their province. Three local Heredian football clubs, Club Sport Renacimiento, Club Sport Juan J. Flores, and Club Sport Cristóbal Colón incorporated themselves to form Club Sport Herediano. Native Heredian football players such as José Joaquín "Toquita" Gutiérrez, Eladio Rosabal Cordero, Víctor Manuel Ruiz, Gilberto and Claudio Arguedas, and Luis Valerio (who all played in various clubs such as La Libertad and Gimnástica Española) united to sign the official constitution of CS Herediano in June 1921. On July 1, 1921, the first official action that CS Herediano took was to purchase land to create a football field. In the same year, CS Herediano began to pressure the Costa Rican government to form a local FA, and thus in 1921 the Federación Costarricense de Fútbol was formed and the first national championship was scheduled—which CS Herediano would win.

In 1925, CS Herediano embarked on its first international match when it had a six-game tour in Jamaica in which they won four, tied and lost one. In 1928 CS Herediano travelled to El Salvador to play several international matches against local clubs. They beat Cuscatlán twice, once by a score of 11–0 and then again 11–1. They also beat FAS in Santa Ana 4–0, and beat Sonsonate 8–0. The club's most historic victory came in 1932 in Costa Rica's National Stadium in La Sabana, when CS Herediano beat the Argentina National team 3–1. In its first decade of existence CS Herediano won 6 national titles, four of them consecutively. CS Herediano is considered the Costa Rican club team with the most international experience. They also won the 1988 "Copa Camel", beating in the process Mexican teams like Puebla and UAG Tecos on American soil. Recently, CS Herediano, also known as "Los Florenses", have ended a championship drought of 19 years (going back to the 1992–93 season) by winning the Verano 2012 tournament, in a brilliant display of attacking and offensive play in the final part of the season. After that, thousands of Herediano's fans celebrated the victory in the streets, displaying what some people now estimate is the biggest football celebration in the country's history. In those years 19 previous years, Costa Rica saw only four teams win the championship, Saprissa, Alajuelense, Liberia Mia, and Brujas. To CS Herediano's credit they were consistently at the finals, but victory seemed to escape their grasp. In the 2005–06 season, CS Herediano unveiled a new official team logo of a tiger grasping the letters CSH. Although this was supposed become the new image for the team, the original logo remained as the official shield of the team's uniform.

On May 19, 2012, Herediano put an end to a drought of titles by winning the 22nd against Santos de Guápiles with an aggregate score of 6–3.

However, despite this, Herediano were suffering severe financial trouble that was until American businessman David J. Patey who was working and residing in Costa Rica decided to form a consortium with his brothers (Mike and Mark) to purchase the club on October 30, 2012..

Estadio Eladio Rosabal Cordero
The construction of a stadium in the city of Heredia began on December 22, 1945, under the direction of Rafael Herrera Feluco (Drunk).

The Municipal Council of the Canton Central played a key role in donating two plots for this purpose to Club Sport Herediano, albeit with a number of conditions: the work must be completed within a five-year-period, providing the stage for other county’s sporting events, and above all, the club cannot sell the property within a period of 99 years from the execution of the deed of sale and can only be mortgaged to invest these funds in the construction or maintenance of the property.

The construction of the stadium was managed by a loan from the Banco Nacional de Costa Rica, as well as inputs from the community, local organizations and the government of the Republic of Costa Rica itself.

The inaugural date is August 21, 1949, in which Herediano played its first match against the Gimnástica Española, with a score of 3–1. However, it has been discussed the opening day due to lack of a paper record that references this inaugural match to be considered the official opening game.

In 1964 the former manager Vicente Montero made a motion for the stadium to be named Eladio Rosabal Cordero. Thus, by the end of the decade of the 1960s the stadium was officially baptized under that name.

The stadium’s lighting was installed that same year, and in 1974 broadcasting booths were finished. In the late seventies the south-sector-grandstand was built.

In early 2010, the grass was replaced by latest generation of synthetic turf with dimensions of 105.80 meters long and 68 meters wide.

At present, the stadium has a capacity for 8,144 spectators, and it is owned by the Asociacion Deportiva Club Sport Herediano. Bleachers are divided into: Sol General, Sol Numerado, Sombra Numerada and Palcos.

Kit
The first uniform was bought at the Tomas Salazar´s Central Market stand, thanks to an economical contribution of Joaquín "Toquita" Gutierrez. The purchase was made for a dozen shirts, similar to the worn by the military in time of the Federico Tinoco government. Wearing a greyish jersey combined with white short pants; that is how Herediano showed to its first official championship match against Liga Deportiva Alajuelense – which was indeed, their first winning game-.

The distinctive usage of red and yellow as the club´s colors began in 1926, when the Club Fortuna de Cuba visited Costa Rican soil for the second time in history. The manager of the Cuban team was interested in setting up a match with Herediano, but had the drawback that Herediano did not have a proper uniform for that kind of international events. The solution was found in the New Century Warehouse owned by Ramón Herrero, who had imported red-and-yellow-striped uniforms to be used by the Spanish Gymnastic Society team. At the end, the Hispanic team did not purchase them and once again Joaquín Gutiérrez made a deal to get the uniforms, which eventually became the emblematic jersey for the club.

The red and yellow colors were added in the statutes by a reform in 1929, which stated that official uniform is a vertical red/yellow striped shirt combined with black shorts and stockings. This provision remained for seventy years, until this was excluded from the current statutes. Herediano wore a sponsorship in its shirt for the first time in 1978, when the brand Toshiba was stamped on his chest.

Kit Suppliers

Team resume
 Seasons in First Division: 97 (since 1921).
 Best position in the league: 1
 Best position in the IFFHS ranking:
 Historical:
 Latest: 151 (November 2012)
 First official match: Alajuelense 1 – Herediano 3 (July 10, 1921, in Plaza Yglesias, Alajuela. Guillermo Pérez, Chavarría and Joaquín Manuel Gutiérrez scored for Herediano).
 Biggest score difference:
 League matches: 8–0 against Alajuelense (1921), 12–1 against Juventud Mata Redonda (1928), 9–0 against Corsarios (1930), 9–0 against Club Sport México (1932), 8–0 against Gimnástica Española (1960).
 International matches: 8–0 against Alpha United (2011), 8–0 against Vida SC (1980), 8–0 a Fortuna (1926), 11–0 against Hércules (1929), 11–1 against España FC (1929).
 All-time scorer: Claudio Jara (99 goals).
 Most games played player: Germán Chavarría (493 games), Marvin Obando (480 games), Geovanny Jara (422 games).
 Most seasons played player: Anibal Varela (1932–57).
 Most championship winning player: Eladio Rosabal, Braulio Morales (8 titles each one) and Oscar Esteban Granados Maroto (10 titles).
 Most championship winning coach: Odir Jacques and Ismael Quesada (4 titles each one).
 Retired numbers: 6 (Retired in honor of Edgar Quesada).

Honours
Club Sport Herediano is the third most winning club of the Costa Rican Primera División

National

Costa Rican Primera División
Champions (29): 1921, 1922, 1924, 1927, 1930, 1931, 1932, 1933, 1935, 1937, 1947, 1948, 1951, 1955, 1961 (ASOFUTBOL), 1978, 1979, 1981, 1985, 1987, 1992–93, 2012 Verano, 2013 Verano, 2015 Verano, 2016 Verano, 2017 Verano, 2018 Apertura, 2019 Apertura, 2021 Apertura.

International

CONCACAF League
Winners: 2018

Performance in international competitions
Fraternidad Tournament: 4 appearances
1971 – Third place
1972 – Third place
1975 – Third place
1978 – First round vs.  FAS – 0:0, 0:2 (FAS advances 0:2 on aggregate)

CONCACAF Champions' Cup: 6 appearances
1962 – First Round vs.  Guadalajara – 2:0 (Guadalajara advances 2:0 on aggregate)
1975 – Second Round vs.  Saprissa – 0:2, 2:1 (Deportivo Saprissa advances 3:2 on aggregate)
1980 – First Round vs.  Marathón – 0:3, 3:1 (Marathón advances 4:3 on aggregate)
1987 – Third Round (finished third in Group 2)
1989 – Fourth Round vs.  Pumas UNAM – 1:1, 1:5 (Pumas UNAM advances 6:2 on aggregate)
1994 – Second Round vs.  Atlante – 3:3, 1:3 (Atlante advances 6:4 on aggregate)

Copa Interclubes UNCAF: 1 appearance
2004 – Quarter-finals vs.  Olimpia – 2:3, 1:0 (Olimpia advances 3:3 on aggregate)

CONCACAF Champions League: 7 appearances
 2009–10 – Preliminary Round vs.  Cruz Azul – 2:6, 0:0 (Cruz Azul advances 6:2 on aggregate)
 2011–12 – Group stage (finished fourth in Group D)
 2012–13 – Quarter-finals vs.  Los Angeles Galaxy – 0:0, 1:4 (Galaxy advances 1:4 on aggregate)
 2013–14 – Group stage (finished second in Group D)
 2014–15 – Semi-finals vs.  América – 3:0, 0:6 (Club América advances 3:6 on aggregate)
 2015–16 – Group stage (finished second in Group B)
 2016–17 – Group stage (finished second in Group G)

CONCACAF League: 1 appearance
 2018 – Round of 16 vs.  Santa Tecla – 1:0, 1:2 (C.S. Herediano advances 2:2 on away goals)
 2018 – Quarter-finals vs.  Universitario – 3:0, 1:2 (C.S. Herediano won 5–1 on aggregate.)
 2018 – Semi-finals vs.  Árabe Unido – 2:0, 0:1 (C.S. Herediano won 2–1 on aggregate.)
 2018 – Winners vs.  Motagua – 2:0, 2:1 (C.S. Herediano won 3–2 on aggregate.)

Player records

|-

Current squad
As of February 8, 2023

Historical list of coaches

  Joaquín Gutiérrez (1921–22)
  Eladio Rosabal (1924–27)
  Braulio Morales (1930)
  Eladio Rosabal (1931)
  Braulio Morales (1932)
  Gilberto Arguedas (1933)
  Milton Valverde (1937)
  Aníbal Varela (19??)
  Rafael Herrera (1943–44)
  Ismael Quesada (1947–48), (1951), (1955)
  Santiago Bonilla (1955)
  Francisco Sánchez (19??)
  Fernando Bonilla (19??)
  Maximiliano Villalobos (19??)
  Oscar Bejarano (19??)
  Manrique Quesada (19??)
  Eduardo Toba Muiño (1961)
  Mario Murillo (1962–63)
  Carlos Farrez (1964)
  Eduardo Viso Abella (1965)
  Alfredo Piedra (1966)
  Domingo Borja (1967)
  José Meza (1968)
  Román Soto (1968)
  Hugo Tassara (1969)
  Hernán Alvarado (1970)
  Edgar Quesada (1971)
  Antonio Moyano (1972–73)
  Orlando de León (1974)
  Odir Jacques (1978)
  Marvin Rodríguez (1979–80)
  Odir Jacques (1981–82)
  Antonio Moyano (1984)
  Odir Jacques (1985–86)
  Antonio Moyano (1987–89)
  Orlando de León (1990–91)
  Josef Bouska (1991)
  Juan Luis Hernández (1992–93)
  Rolando Villalobos (1993–94)
  Carlos Miloc (1994–95)
  Álvaro Grant (1994–95)
  Gustavo Merino (1995–96)
  Alexandre Guimarães (1996–97)
  Henry Duarte (1997–98)
  Odir Jacques (1997–98)
  Carlos Oria (1998–99)
  Fernando Sosa (1999–00)
  Orlando de León (July 1, 1999 – March 28, 2000)
  Zlatko Petričević (March 29, 2000 – June 30, 2000)
  Carlos Linaris (2000–01)
  Odir Jacques (2001)
  Roger Flores (2001–02)
  Carlos Watson (2001–02)
  Ramón Vecinos (2002–03)
  Ildo Maneiro (July 1, 2003 – Dec 31, 2003)
  Enrique Rodriguez (2004)
  Ronald Mora (Jan 1, 2004 – June 30, 2005)
  Guillerme Farinha (July 1, 2005 – Dec 31, 2005)
  Carlos Watson (Jan 1, 2006 – Dec 31, 2006)
  Javier Delgado (Jan 1, 2007 – March 31, 2008)
  Paulo Wanchope (April 1, 2008 – June 30, 2009)
  Rónald Mora (July 1, 2009 – July 31, 2009)
  Kenneth Paniagua (interim) (Aug 1, 2009 – Aug 8, 2009)
  Salvador Ragusa (Aug 9, 2009 – Dec 31, 2009)
  Luis Diego Arnaez (Jan 1, 2010 – March 8, 2010)
  Orlando de León (March 8, 2010 – Dec 31, 2010)
  Alejandro Giuntini (Jan 1, 2011 – Sept 5, 2011)
  Jafet Soto (Sept 5, 2011 – March 26, 2012)
  Odir Jacques (March 26, 2012 – Aug 25, 2012)
  Claudio Jara (Aug 25, 2012 – Dec 31, 2012)
  Mauricio Solís (Jan 3, 2013 – Feb 18, 2013)
  Marvin Solano (Feb 19, 2013 – March 28, 2014)
  Eduardo Méndez (March 28, 2014 – Aug 29, 2014)
  Jafet Soto (Aug 29, 2014 – Dec 14)
  Mauricio Wright (Dec 2014 – April 28, 2015)
  Odir Jacques (April 28, 2015–15)
  Hernán Medford (2016 – Dec 2017)
  Jafet Soto (Dec 2017 – April 2018)
  Jaime de la Pava (May 2018– Sept 2018)
  Jafet Soto (September 2018– December 2020)
  Fernando Palomeque (December 2020 - February 2021)
  Luis Marin (February 2021 - May 2021)
  David Patiño (June 2021 - September 2021)
  Jeaustin Campos (September 2021 - February 2022)
  Jafet Soto (March 2022 - Present)

References

External links
 
 

Football clubs in Costa Rica
Association football clubs established in 1921
Club Sport Herediano
 
H